V.Rm. Letchumanan Chettiar (1897–1950) was an Indian businessman and politician from Ceylon.

History

Chettiar was born in Valayapatti, Princely state of Pudukottai. He grew bored with managing his family banking business, and eventually moved to Ceylon to explore new business ventures. With immense struggle started transport business named VRMVA Traders. And the other ventures included a Woodstock tea estates, Pudukottai Power Supply Unit, Namanasamudra Textiles, Pico (Pudukottai Industrial Corporation) Garage, and an agricultural research farm in Letchmanapuram, Pudukottai district.

Chettiar joined the Indian congress in 1936. Pandit Jawahalal Nehru observing Chettiars influence over in Ceylon, made him the first president of Ceylon Indian Congress on 25 July 1939. Chettiar served as its president, with H.M. Aziz as the secretary, for two years. Then moved back to India for contesting the Pudukottai seat in the Madras State assembly election. He had been a twice member of that electorate earlier, and won the 1939 August election with a convincing majority.

Chettiar also served as an official translator for the Thondaimaan family, henceforth he was called as "English Lena" by the kings of Pudukottai.

References 

 http://www.lankalibrary.com/pol/thondaman.html 
 https://web.archive.org/web/20101123024059/http://malayaham.net/historlabunion.html 
 WHO’S WHO "The eminent Persons in India, Burma and Ceylon", 1936–1945, Pg. 156.
 Out of bondage: a biography by Caumiyamūrtti Toṇṭaimān̲- Page 25.
 Documents of the Ceylon National Congress and nationalist politics in Ceylon by Caumiyamūrtti Toṇṭaimān̲ - Biography & Autobiography - 1987 - Page 2641.
 Tea and politics: an autobiography - Page 17 by Caumiyamūrtti Toṇṭaimān̲, S. Thondaman - Politicians - 1994 - 295 pages.
 Khosia's Industrial & Commercial Directory of India, Pakistan, Burma & Ceylon by Kanshi Ram Khosia - India
 The Indo-Lankans, their 200-year saga: a pictorial record of the people - Page 289 by S. Muthiah, Indian Heritage Foundation (Sri Lanka) - East Indians - 2003 - 315 pages.
 Education and the Indian Plantation Worker in Sri Lanka - Page 112 by G. A. Gnanamuttu - Education, Rural - 1977 - 138 pages.

Further reading
 

1897 births
1950 deaths
Ceylon Workers' Congress politicians
Indian emigrants to Sri Lanka